Gian Luca Tocchi (10 January 1901 – 14 September 1992) was an Italian composer. He studied with Ottorino Respighi and Bernardino Molinari at the Accademia di Santa Cecilia in Rome. His work was part of the music event in the art competition at the 1936 Summer Olympics.

References

1901 births
1992 deaths
Italian male composers
Olympic competitors in art competitions
People from Perugia
20th-century Italian male musicians